Vittoria Ligari (14 February 1713 - 9 October 1783) was an Italian painter.

Life and work

Vittoria Ligari was born in Milan, near San Babila, in February 1713. Her mother was Nunziata Steiningher and her father was Pietro Ligari. She died in December 1783.

Notable works

San Giuseppe con Bambino (Saint Joseph with Child), between 1730 and 1783, Ligari Foundation, Valtellina Museum of History and Art

Gallery

Further reading

Tra la terra e il cielo. Pietro, Cesare, Vittoria Ligari: una famiglia di artisti. Milan: Carthusia.

References

1713 births
1783 deaths
Catholic painters
Italian women painters
Painters from Milan
18th-century Italian women artists